Benchlands is a hamlet in Alberta within the Municipal District of Bighorn No. 8. The  Ghost River is located on the hamlet's south side, while Highway 40 borders the north side.

Demographics 

See also 
List of communities in Alberta
List of designated places in Alberta
List of hamlets in Alberta

References 

Municipal District of Bighorn No. 8
Hamlets in Alberta
Designated places in Alberta